The Granite Ridge Conference is a high school athletic conference that is sanctioned by the Minnesota State High School League. The conference was designed to create a better alignment for the involved schools.  Currently, there are eight members.  The largest school, Becker High School has 822 students and the smallest school, Mora High School has 425.

Granite Ridge Schools

Team Champions

Fall Sports 

Cross Country

References

External links
 Official website

2010 establishments in Minnesota
Minnesota high school sports conferences